James Madison Pearce (June 9, 1925 – July 17, 2005) was an American professional baseball baseball player and right-handed pitcher.

He worked in 20 games, including three starting pitcher assignments, and won two of three decisions, including his first MLB complete game, a 9–3 triumph against the St. Louis Browns on August 28 at Griffith Stadium. But he posted an abysmal 6.04 earned run average over the season in 56 innings pitched, didn't get another trial with the Senators until April 1953, and would work in only eight more big-league games in his career.

Acquired by Cincinnati after an outstanding  season in the Double-A Southern Association, Pearce was highly effective in two September 1954 appearances. He held the Brooklyn Dodgers scoreless in a two-inning relief stint at Ebbets Field on September 14. Then, six days later, he was selected to start against another first-division team, the Milwaukee Braves, at County Stadium. Pearce threw a complete game, 3–1 victory, with Milwaukee's only run scoring unearned when the Redlegs made two errors in the field in the seventh inning.

The following April 16, Pearce tried to duplicate his success against the Braves, starting against them at Cincinnati's Crosley Field. He allowed an unearned run in the second inning, and then was driven from the mound in the third when Milwaukee strung together four straight hits, good for three runs. Pearce was charged with the 9–5 loss. He made one final appearance in the majors as a relief pitcher over two weeks later, allowing one earned run in one inning pitched against the Philadelphia Phillies. He spent the rest of his career in the minor leagues, retiring after the 1959 season.

His major league career consisted of 30 games pitched, a 3–4 win–loss record, with 97 hits and 53 bases on balls allowed and 22 strikeouts in 85 innings pitched. His career earned run average was 5.78.

References

External links

Retrosheet
Venezuelan Baseball League statistics

1925 births
2005 deaths
Baseball players from North Carolina
Charleston ChaSox players
Charlotte Hornets (baseball) players
Chattanooga Lookouts players
Cincinnati Redlegs players
Drummondville Cubs players
Erwin Cubs players
Fayetteville Cubs players
Industriales de Valencia players
Leaksville-Draper-Spray Triplets players
Macon Peaches players
Major League Baseball pitchers
New Orleans Pelicans (baseball) players
Omaha Cardinals players
People from Zebulon, North Carolina
Portsmouth Cubs players
Shelby Cubs players
Toronto Maple Leafs (International League) players
Washington Senators (1901–1960) players